Dasai Chowdhary  is an Indian politician. He was elected to the Lok Sabha, the lower house of the Parliament of India from the Rosera in Bihar as a member of the Janata Dal.

References

External links
Official biographical sketch in Parliament of India website

1953 births
Janata Dal politicians
India MPs 1989–1991
Living people
Rashtriya Lok Samata politicians
Nationalist Congress Party politicians
Bharatiya Janata Party politicians from Bihar